Santiago González Torre (born 24 February 1983) is a Mexican professional tennis player. His career-high ATP ranking is World No. 155 in singles, achieved in May 2006, and World No. 22 in doubles, achieved in March 2022. He has won 19 ATP doubles titles.  In 2017, he reached the French Open final in doubles along with his partner Donald Young. Additionally, he has reached the finals of three other Grand Slam tournaments in the Mixed category: the 2013 French Open and the 2014 and 2015 US Open. González represents Mexico at the Davis Cup competition; currently his record is 22–16.

Tennis career

2009-2010: Major singles debut, Top 100 & First ATP title in doubles
González qualified at the 2009 Wimbledon Championships to make his Grand Slam debut. He lost his first round main draw match in Wimbledon against Israeli Dudi Sela.
He also made his Grand Slam debut in qualifications in singles at the 2009 Australian Open.
He made his top 100 doubles debut on 12 October 2009.

He won his first ATP title at the 2010 Serbia Open partnering American Travis Rettenmaier.

2011-2014: Eight doubles titles, top 25 debut
In April 2011, partnering with American Scott Lipsky, he won the ATP World Tour 500 title of the Barcelona Open. They defeated the Bryan brothers 5–7, 6–2, [12–10], breaking their 10-match winning streak. They also defeated doubles teams Jürgen Melzer & Nenad Zimonjić 6–3, 6–2, and Max Mirnyi & Daniel Nestor 7–6, 6–4. He reached the top 25 on 30 January 2012. He won a total of seven titles with Lipsky between 2011 and 2014.

2017: French Open doubles final
In June 2017, he reached his first Grand Slam final partnering Donald Young of the USA at the French Open.

2021: Sixteenth title
In 2021, González and his current partner Marcelo Demoliner took the first dose of a COVID-19 vaccine at the 2021 Serbia Open.
During the grass season, he won his fourteenth ATP title at Stuttgart Open defeating Uruguayan Ariel Behar and Gonzalo Escobar from Ecuador with Demoliner.

In September, González won his fifteenth ATP doubles title at the 2021 Astana Open partnering Andres Molteni. In November he won the 2021 Stockholm Open his sixteenth title also with Molteni.

2022: 300th match win, Two more titles, Maiden Masters 1000 final
In 2022, he won two more clay titles with Molteni at the 2022 Córdoba Open and 2022 Argentina Open.

He made his maiden Masters final at the 2022 BNP Paribas Open in Indian Wells with Édouard Roger-Vasselin using a protected ranking after defeating reigning US Open Champions and 2nd seeded pair of Joe Salisbury and Rajeev Ram. They lost in the final to American duo Isner/Sock. As a result he reached a new doubles career-high of No. 22 on 21 March 2022.

Significant finals

Grand Slam finals

Doubles: 1 (1 runner-up)

Mixed doubles: 3 (3 runner-ups)

Masters 1000 finals

Doubles: 1 (1 runner-up)

ATP career finals

Doubles: 34 (19 titles, 15 runner-ups)

Challenger and Futures finals

Singles: 17 (9–8)

Doubles: 73 (44–29)

Doubles performance timeline

Current through the 2022 Mexican Open.

Notes

References

External links

Wimbledon profile
US Open profile

Living people
1983 births
Mexican male tennis players
Tennis players at the 2003 Pan American Games
Tennis players at the 2007 Pan American Games
Tennis players at the 2011 Pan American Games
Sportspeople from Veracruz
Sportspeople from Córdoba, Veracruz
Pan American Games gold medalists for Mexico
Pan American Games bronze medalists for Mexico
Tennis players at the 2016 Summer Olympics
Olympic tennis players of Mexico
Pan American Games medalists in tennis
Central American and Caribbean Games gold medalists for Mexico
Central American and Caribbean Games silver medalists for Mexico
Competitors at the 2002 Central American and Caribbean Games
Competitors at the 2014 Central American and Caribbean Games
Central American and Caribbean Games medalists in tennis
Medalists at the 2003 Pan American Games
Medalists at the 2011 Pan American Games